Fabienne Regamey (born 7 February 1952) is a Swiss fencer. She competed in the women's individual foil event at the 1972 Summer Olympics.

References

External links
 

1952 births
Living people
Swiss female foil fencers
Olympic fencers of Switzerland
Fencers at the 1972 Summer Olympics